The Spokane, Portland and Seattle Railway (SP&S) used a combination of new and used locomotives.

Steam locomotives 

Most of these locomotives were purchased or leased from the SP&S's parent roads Great Northern Railway and Northern Pacific Railway. The 4-8-4 Northerns and 4-6-6-4 Challengers were purchased new.
This roster groups steam locomotives by their wheel arrangement.

Diesel locomotives 

Most of these locomotives were purchased new by the SP&S. Some were, however, purchased second-hand from the Great Northern. The SP&S gained some notoriety with railroad fans for its large proportion of diesels manufactured by Alco. For detailed info see John Gaertner's book or SP&S Historical Society

References

 
Railway locomotive-related lists